Hollywood Beat is an American crime drama series that aired on ABC from September 21 until November 23, 1985. starring Jack Scalia, Jay Acovone, Edward Winter and John Matuszak. The series aired on Saturday nights at 8:00 p.m Eastern time.

Cast
 Jack Scalia as Det. Nick McCarren
 Jay Acovone as Det. Jack Rado
 John Matuszak as George Grinsky
 Edward Winter as Capt. Wes Biddle

Episodes

References

External links 
 
 

1985 American television series debuts
1985 American television series endings
Television series by Spelling Television
American Broadcasting Company original programming
1980s American LGBT-related drama television series
English-language television shows
Television series by CBS Studios
1980s American crime drama television series
Television shows set in Los Angeles